Scirpophaga linguatella is a moth in the family Crambidae. It was described by Fu-Qiang Chen, Shi-Mei Song and Chun-Sheng Wu in 2006. It is found in Yunnan, China.

Both the forewings and hindwings are uniform white.

References

Moths described in 2006
Schoenobiinae
Moths of Asia